Stephen or Steven McCarthy may refer to:

Stephen A. McCarthy (1908–1990), American librarian
Stephen McCarthy (Australian footballer) (born 1962), Australian footballer
Steve McCarthy (boxer) (1962–2017), British boxer
Steve McCarthy (ice hockey) (born 1981), Canadian hockey player
Stephen McCarthy (musician), guitarist with The Long Ryders
Stephen McCarthy (soccer) (born 1988), American soccer player
Steven McCarthy (actor), Canadian actor and filmmaker